Arthur Joseph Christopher Howes (15 July 1950 – 29 November 2004) was a documentary film maker and teacher.

Life
Howes was born in Gibraltar on 15 July 1950, and moved to London as a teenager. He was married to Amy Hardie and had one son. He died from lung cancer in London on 29 November 2004, aged 54.

Career
Howes studied teaching, then film-making at the Polytechnic of Central London. He went on to have a long career in documentary film-making and was particularly known for a trilogy about the Sudanese civil war. He also taught during his career at University of Essex and the London College of Printing. At this time of his death he was working on a film Bacchanalias Bahianas 1-5 which was left unfinished. He had worked on this film in Brazil and it focussed on beach culture in Bahia.

Sudanese films
Kafi's Story (1989)
Nuba Conversations (2000)
Benjamin and his Brother (2002)

References

British documentary film directors
British documentary film producers
1950 births
2004 deaths
Gibraltarians
Alumni of the University of Westminster
20th-century British businesspeople